Kanati Clothing Company is a privately held fashion lifestyle company. The line made its fashion debut with a men's sportswear collection for the spring 2009 season.  The Canadian menswear label, manufacturer and retailer is based in Toronto, Ontario. The company launched its flagship retail location in Waterloo, Ontario in 2014. The Kanati Co. brand is distributed in North America, United Kingdom, Europe and Japan through GSG Apparel, Inc.

History 
The Kanati Clothing Company was formed in July 2009 in Toronto, Ontario. Kanati Co. quickly became a celebrity favorite and in 2012 entered into a new multi-year international distribution arrangement.
The company gained notoriety as a pioneer in the fashion industry by creating an Aboriginal-influenced premium lifestyle band which had not yet been seen before. 
The brand was popularized in the U.S by its appearance in numerous music videos from artists like Drag-On of Ruff Ryders Entertainment, Joey Stylez, Meek Mill, Ja Rule and other popular musicians like Sean P from the group YoungBloodZ. The label was seen on music group Winnipeg's Most in the Maclean's Magazine "Straight Outta Winnipeg" feature  as well as on CBC Television's Aboriginal series 8th Fire hosted by Wab kinew.

In 2014 the brand launched a made-on-demand cut and sew program for independent small to medium-sized private labels. The program features the Signature Young line by Curtis Young who is the son of musician and businessman Dr. Dre. The made-on-demand program operates on a membership basis and eliminates a majority of the costs associated with maintaining a clothing company. The system allows labels to order as little as one item at a time and enables designers to get premium cut and sew as opposed to using traditional third-party blank garments.

In 2015 Kanati Co. partnered with Navajo model Deanne Jean Vanwinkle to create "Clothes for Kids". The company donated clothing to children on the Navajo Indian Reservation in Arizona and they plan to donate to different locations annually.

Kanati Co. officially opened a new two-level facility in Waterloo, Ontario in May, 2015 in a $5 million partnership with GSG Apparel. GSG Apparel would purchase 100% of manufacturing rights in July 2015 from the new parent company. The company also moved its headquarters to Mississauga, Ontario and will remain in the Greater Toronto Area(GTA) under the acquisition and change of ownership.

In July 2015, the Kanati Co. brand sold and the board of directors named Peter Phaboriboun as president and CEO and announced the opening of a new retail location in August 2015. Under Phaboriboun's leadership, the company will work towards each division being able to function independently and focus on their separate and distinct identities.

In December 2015, Kanati Co. donated $25,000 to Syrian refugees making Canada their new home. The company also would donate to organizations such as the Salvation Army, House of Friendship, Ray of Hope and Mary's Place.

Made in Canada 

In 2015, after doing business in Pakistan for six years;  Kanati Co. pulled all of its production from Pakistan due to supply chain issues causing the company delays. The company cited hostile trading conditions, energy  and transportation issues in Pakistan as a continued disruption to its supply chain. Kanati Co became the second high-profile company to pull production from Pakistan, blaming disruptions to orders and the country's instability. Its decision came after US-based Walt Disney last year phased out the sourcing of Disney-branded products from Pakistan, saying the country no longer met its guidelines on working conditions. Both companies identified risks in the country that outweighed the benefits of continuing business in the country. An eye-opening report published in Pakistan Today cited Kanati Co. and Walt Disney exiting the country among other companies and stated "The state is unraveling stitch by stitch. At this rate we are in danger of no state."

As a result of transport difficulties resulting in Kanati Co. spending "far too much time, effort and money" in Pakistan, the company announced it was switching to a domestic production approach in 2015 and would be manufacturing all of its products in Waterloo, Ontario where it can control all aspects of production it couldn't overseas. The company said it could no longer hope for improvements as it takes pride in providing quality service and takes appropriate action when their standards are compromised. Kanati Co. stated that it would not consider returning production to the Pakistan anytime soon. The stability of the country and supply chain disruptions was key reasons for the company to close doors overseas and re-shore to Canada. Kanati Company will no longer allow Pakistan as a permitted materials sourcing country. Kanati Co. now produces its products in Canada.

Products & Services 
The Kanati Co. line is known for its use of high-grade materials, Aboriginal influence and elite status. Kanati Co. lines include men's T-shirts, polo shirts, thermals, leather, jackets, button downs, hoodies, Japanese denim, shorts, skateboards, accessories and swimwear. The label is also well known for its premium headwear  including Snapback (hat)s customized with leather and animal prints and hand crafted 5-panels made from different materials including snakeskin.

Kanati Co. also manufactures different fashion lines specifically for different countries and retailers around the world.

The company once offered a private label manufacturing service based on a pre-qualified membership process. It also offers design services and retails Canadian-made brands. This service was acquired by GSG Apparel and is no longer offered through Kanati.

External links
 Kanati Clothing Company 
 Kanati Shuts Ops in Pakistan

References 

Manufacturing companies based in Toronto
Clothing companies of Canada
Clothing companies established in 2009
Retail companies established in 2014
Indigenous culture in Canada
Clothing manufacturers